This article is about the Delville Wood order of battle. The Battle of Delville Wood was fought from  1916, one of the twelve battles of the Somme in 1916. It was fought by the British and French against the army of the German Empire in the Somme River valley in northern France. The battle was the début of the 1st South African Brigade (part of the 9th (Scottish) Division) on the Western Front, which captured Delville Wood and held it from  The casualties of the brigade were similar to those of many British brigades on First day on the Somme (1 July 1916).

Delville Wood is well preserved with the remains of trenches, a museum and monument to the 1st South African Brigade. After the relief of the South Africans the battle for the wood continued until the end of August, when the last German footholds were captured by the 43rd Brigade of the 14th (Light) Division on 27 August.

Orders of Battle

British and Dominion forces

South African casualties

Note: * = Officers

German Forces

Footnotes

References

Further reading

Books
 
 

Journals

External links

 German situation maps, 14, 31 July

Conflicts in 1916
1916 in France
Battles of the Western Front (World War I)
Battles of World War I involving the United Kingdom
Battles of World War I involving Germany
Battles of World War I involving South Africa
Battle of the Somme
World War I orders of battle